Silver Spoons & Broken Bones is the only studio album by East Anglian band Stone Gods and was released on July 7, 2008 through Play It Again Sam. It is the band's first full-length album. Two of the songs, "Burn the Witch" and "You Brought a Knife to a Gunfight", were previously released on the limited edition Burn the Witch EP.

The album started pretty much from day one of Stone Gods. After forming, they wrote around 35 songs during the making of the album. It was recorded at Dan Hawkins's home studio, Leeders Farm.

The first single from the album, "Knight of the Living Dead", was released on 23 June 2008. The album was leaked nearly a month early, on 12 June 2008. The second single from the album "Don't Drink The Water" was released on 27 October 2008. The next single release was "Start of Something".

They supported Airbourne and Black Stone Cherry on UK tours.

Track listing

Other tracks
 "Breakdown" (Appeared on "Burn the Witch (EP)") – 3:23
 "Heartburn" (Appeared on "Burn the Witch (EP)") – 4:12
 "Goodbye" (B-Side To "Knight of the Living Dead") – 4:30
 "Pretty Ugly" (B-Side To "Knight of the Living Dead") – 3:09

Personnel
 Richie Edwards – lead vocals, rhythm guitar, acoustic guitar
 Dan Hawkins – lead guitar, piano, acoustic guitar, backing vocals
 Toby MacFarlaine – bass guitar, acoustic bass guitar, backing vocals
 Ed Graham – drums, percussion
 Phillip Wing – Tambourine

2008 debut albums